Harivansh Rai Bachchan (27 November 1907  18 January 2003) was an Indian poet and writer of the Nayi Kavita literary movement (romantic upsurge) of early 20th century Hindi literature. He was also a poet of the Hindi Kavi Sammelan. He is best known for his early work Madhushala. He was also the husband of social activist, Teji Bachchan, father of Amitabh Bachchan and Ajitabh Bachchan, and grandfather of Abhishek Bachchan. In 1976, he received the Padma Bhushan for his service to Hindi literature.

Early life 
Bachchan was born at Babupatti, United Provinces of Agra and Oudh in British India on 27 November 1907 into an Awadhi Hindu Kayastha family. His family name was  Srivastav. He began using the pen name "Bachchan" (meaning child) instead of Srivastava when he wrote Hindi poetry. From 1941 to 1957, he taught in the English Department at the Allahabad University and after that, he spent the next two years at St Catharine's College, Cambridge, Cambridge University completing a PhD on W.B. Yeats.

Writing career
Bachchan was fluent in several Hindi languages, namely standard Hindustani and the local Awadhi dialect. He incorporated a broadly Hindustani vocabulary, written in Devanagari script. While he could not read Persian script, he was influenced by Persian and Urdu poetry, particularly Omar Khayyam.

Works used in movies
Bachchan's work has been used in movies and music. For example, couplets of his work "Agneepath" are used throughout the 1990 blockbuster movie Agneepath, featuring his son Amitabh Bachchan, and also later in the 2012 remake Agneepath, starring Hrithik Roshan. and recently in the TV Serial Ishqbaaz.

{{cquote|Mitti ka tan, masti ka man, kshan-bhar jivan– mera parichay. (मिट्टी का तन, मस्ती का मन, क्षण भर जीवन, मेरा परिचय) (A body of clay, a mind full of play, a life of a moment – that's me)
}}

List of works

 Poems
 Chal Mardane
 Barsaat Ki Aati Hawa 
 Tera Haar (तेरा हार) (1932)
 Madhushala (मधुशाला) (1935)
 Madhubala (Poems) (मधुबाला) (1936)
 Madhukalash (मधुकलश) (1937)
 Raat Aadhi Kheench Kar Meri Hatheli
 Nisha Nimantran (निशा निमंत्रण) (1938)
 Ekaant Sangeet (एकांत संगीत) (1939)
 Aakul Antar (आकुल अंतर) (1943)
 Satarangini (सतरंगिनी) (1945)
 Halaahal (हलाहल) (1946)
 Bengal ka Kaavya (बंगाल का काव्य) (1946)
 Khaadi ke Phool (खादी के फूल) (1948)
 Soot ki Maala (सूत की माला) (1948)
 Milan Yamini (मिलन यामिनी) (1950)
 Pranay Patrika (प्रणय पत्रिका) (1955)
 Dhaar ke idhar udhar (धार के इधर उधर) (1957)
 Aarti aur Angaare (आरती और अंगारे) (1958)
 Buddha aur Naachghar (बुद्ध और नाचघर) (1958)
 Tribhangima (त्रिभंगिमा) (1961)
 Chaar kheme Chaunsath khoonte (चार खेमे चौंसठ खूंटे) (1962)
 Do Chattane (दो चट्टानें) (1965)
 Bahut din beete (बहुत दिन बीते) (1967)
 Kat-ti pratimaaon ki awaaz (कटती प्रतिमाओं की आवाज़) (1968)
 Ubharte pratimaano ke roop (उभरते प्रतिमानों के रूप) (1969)
 Jaal sameta (जाल समेटा) (1973)
 Nirman (निर्माण)
 Aathmaparichai (आत्मपरिचय)
 Ek Geet (एक गीत)
 Agneepath (अग्निपथ)

 Miscellaneous

 Bachpan ke saath kshan bhar (बचपन के साथ क्षण भर) (1934)
 Khaiyyam ki madhushala (खय्याम की मधुशाला) (1938)
 Sopaan (सोपान) (1953)
 Macbeth (मेकबेथ)(1957)
 Jangeet (जनगीता) (1958)
 Omar Khaiyyam ki rubaaiyan (उमर खय्याम की रुबाइयाँ) (1959)
 Kaviyon ke saumya sant: Pant (कवियों के सौम्य संत: पंत) (1960)
 Aaj ke lokpriya Hindi kavi: Sumitranandan Pant (आज के लोकप्रिय हिन्दी कवि: सुमित्रानंदन पंत) (1960)
 Aadhunik kavi: 7 (आधुनिक कवि: ७) (1961)
 Nehru: Raajnaitik jeevanchitra (नेहरू: राजनैतिक जीवनचित्र) (1961)
 Naye puraane jharokhe (नये पुराने झरोखे) (1962)
 Abhinav sopaan (अभिनव सोपान) (1964)
 Chausath roosi kavitaayein (चौसठ रूसी कवितायें) (1964)
 W. B. Yeats and Occultism (1968)
 Markat dweep ka swar (मरकट द्वीप का स्वर) (1968)
 Naagar geet (नागर गीत) (1966)
 Bachpan ke lokpriya geet (बचपन के लोकप्रिय गीत) (1967)
 Hamlet (1969)
 Bhaasha apni bhaav paraaye (भाषा अपनी भाव पराये) (1970)
 Pant ke sau patra (पंत के सौ पत्र) (1970)
 Pravaas ki diary (प्रवास की डायरी) (1971)
 King Lear (1972)
 Tooti Chooti kadiyan (टूटी छूटी कड़ियां) (1973)
 Meri kavitaayi ki aadhi sadi (मेरी कविताई की आधी सदी) (1981)
 So-ham hans (सोहं हंस) (1981)
 Aathve dashak ki pratinidhi shreshth kavitaayein (आठवें दशक की प्रतिनिधी श्रेष्ठ कवितायें) (1982)
 Meri shreshth kavitaayein (मेरी श्रेष्ठ कवितायें) (1984)
 Jo beet gai so Bat gai

Autobiography

 Kya bhooloon kya yaad karoon (क्या भूलूं क्या याद करूं) (1969)
 Neerh ka nirmaan phir (नीड़ का निर्माण फिर) (1970)
 Basere se door (बसेरे से दूर) (1977)
 Dashdwaar se sopaan tak (दशद्वार से सोपान तक) (1985), In the Afternoon of Time
 Bachchan rachanavali ke nau khand (बच्चन रचनावली के नौ खण्ड) 

 See also 
 Indian Writers
 Indian Poets

 References 

 External links 

 मधुशाला का मूल पाठ (विकीस्रोत पर)
 हरिवंश राय बच्चन (हिन्दी विकीपीडिया पर)
 मधुशाला (हिन्दी विकीपीडिया पर)
 हरिवंश राय बच्चन (विकीस्रोत पर)
 A Collection 

 Further reading 
 Kaveendra, Anil Pushker. Harivanshrai Bachchan Ki Anuvad Drishti'' (Hindi) (Hardcover) (2013). Ruby Press & Co., New Delhi. 

  'कविता -नीड़ का निर्माण फिर फिर

Hindi-language poets
Writers from Allahabad
Alumni of St Catharine's College, Cambridge
1907 births
2003 deaths
20th-century Indian poets
Recipients of the Padma Bhushan in literature & education
Indian male poets
Poets from Uttar Pradesh
20th-century Indian male writers
Harivansh
Recipients of the Sahitya Akademi Award in Hindi